Osteospermum moniliferum (Chrysanthemoides monilifera) is an evergreen flowering shrub or small tree of the Asteraceae (daisy) family that is native to South Africa, such as the Cape Flats Dune Strandveld habitat. Most subspecies have woolly, dull, serrate, oval leaves, but the subspecies rotundata has glossy round leaves. Subspecies are known as boneseed and bitou bush in Australasia, or bietou, tick berry, bosluisbessie, or weskusbietou in South Africa. The plant has become a major environmental weed and invasive species in Australia and New Zealand.

Taxonomy
Chrysanthemoides monilifera is one of two members of the genus Chrysanthemoides, the other being Chrysanthemoides incana.

Chrysanthemoides monilifera has six recognized subspecies:
Chrysanthemoides monilifera subsp. canescens
Chrysanthemoides monilifera subsp. monilifera
Chrysanthemoides monilifera subsp. pisifera
Chrysanthemoides monilifera subsp. rotundata
Chrysanthemoides monilifera subsp. septentrionalis
Chrysanthemoides monilifera subsp. subcanescens

In Australia, C. m. subsp. monilifera is known by the common name 'boneseed', while C. m. subsp. rotundata is known by the common name 'bitou bush'. In New Zealand subspecies are not distinguished and C. monilifera is known simply as 'boneseed'.

Chrysanthemoides monilifera was first described by Carl Linnaeus in 1754 under the name Osteospermum monilifera, however it was given its current binomial name in 1943 by T. Norlindh.

The species name monilifera comes from the Latin, monile, meaning necklace or collar, referring to the shiny fruit arranged around the flowers like a necklace.

Description

Fruit are berry-like, spherical at around 8 mm in diameter, and turn dark-brown to black with a bone-coloured seed inside of 6–7 mm diameter.

Both boneseed and bitou bush hybridise readily, however, so examples of plants demonstrating a fusion of traits is possible.

C. monilifera has been shown to need pollinators in order to reproduce.

Distribution and habitat
Chrysanthemoides monilifera occurs naturally in coastal areas of South Africa, reaching into southern Namibia and Mozambique. The most widespread subspecies in South Africa is pisifera. Subspecies rotundata is concentrated along the eastern coast of South Africa from its southern tip through to the Mozambique border. Subspecies monilifera is concentrated around Cape Town and the Cape Peninsula on South Africa's south western coast.

Invasive species

Australia

In Australia, subspecies rotundata (bitou bush) has naturalised along the coast of Queensland and New South Wales, while subspecies monilifera (boneseed) has naturalised along and near the coast in parts of Victoria and South Australia.

New Zealand
In New Zealand C. monilifera, which is listed on the National Pest Plant Accord, is common in coastal locations throughout the North Island, and can also be found in the South Island in Nelson City, Port Hills (Christchurch) and the Otago Peninsula.

Impact

In Australia, C. monilifera has been particularly successful in invading natural bushland. In part, this is due to the species' ability to establish on relatively nutrient-poor soils and in areas exposed to salt such as coastlines, as well as the ability of the seeds to germinate readily. Disturbances such as fire can assist C. monilifera to spread as the plant produces a large amount of seed that can persist in the soil seed bank for 10 years or more, and this reserve in turn enables the species to quickly recolonize a burnt area.

An individual plant can produce 50,000 seeds a year, about 60% of which are viable. Once germinated, seedlings grow vigorously with dense, bushy growth. This lush growth shades out and displaces slower growing native species that might otherwise occupy the same ecological niche. Rapid, vigorous growth also means that C. monilifera is capable of flowering and setting seed within 12–18 months, making it extremely persistent even in situations where disturbance or regular management activity is common.

Once established, the plant's shallow root system enables it to absorb moisture after light rain before the moisture reaches the roots of more deeply rooted species further limiting opportunities for slower growing species to establish and out-compete C. monilifera over time. Furthermore, outside of Southern Africa the plant has few local, indigenous pathogens or predators to control its growth also reducing the potential for gaps to emerge that might provide opportunities for other species to reestablish. The net consequence of C. monilifera'''s growth characteristics is that outside of its natural ecosystem it can ultimately form large, dense, unhealthy stands of a single species with extraordinarily poor biodiversity.

The plant can extend its existing range in a variety of ways. Its fruit is attractive to birds, rabbits, other animals and even some insects such as ants, and because seeds are tough and difficult to digest they will often be dispersed in animal droppings. Seeds can also spread on vehicles and equipment, in contaminated soil, in garden waste, along water drainage lines and deliberately by human intervention.Chrysanthemoides monilifera, unlike many other weed species, is not generally considered to be a problem for agricultural productivity due to its sensitivity to trampling as well as being readily grazed by stock.

ControlChrysanthemoides monilifera is potentially susceptible to a range of control strategies, but Burgman and Lindenmayer recommended that the strategy chosen be responsive to the local situation and available resources. Due to its relatively shallow root system, removal by hand is an ideal method of control. Where manual removal is impractical, many common herbicides can be used, in which case the herbicide is commonly applied directly to the wood of the plant via a cut notch, or at the end of a pruned stump. Mechanical removal of C. monilifera by tractor or other machinery can also be effective, but that process can be extremely indiscriminate, and is only recommended in areas of poor environmental values and minimal erosion risk.

Another way of tackling an infestation is the use of controlled burns, but there are risks associated with that method. Principally, C. monilifera has higher moisture levels than many Australian indigenous species so, for burns to be effective, a burn of higher than normal intensity is required. That can, in turn, have a detrimental impact on indigenous vegetation which has evolved in response to more frequent, lower-intensity fires. Furthermore, fire can trigger re-germination from the extensive C. monilifera seed bank, potentially worsening the situation. However, if a program is implemented to monitor and control C. monilifera seedlings following the burn and emerging C. monilifera seedlings are removed, burning can be extremely effective at exhausting the seed bank and minimising the chances of re-infestation.

Various methods of biological control have been attempted, particularly the introduction of insects which are natural enemies of C. monilifera, such as the bitou tip moth (Comostolopsis germana) and bitou seed fly (Mesoclanis polana). Although they have had some success in controlling bitou bush (ssp. rotundata) in Australia, to date they have not had similar success in combating boneseed (ssp. monilifera).

In a study carried out by researchers at the University of New England and published in 2017, it was found that a serious error was made with the introduction of biological control agents into Australia for C. monilifera ssp. rotundata. Bitou seed fly (Mesoclanis polana) was introduced based on the naive belief that it is a natural enemy of C. monilifera. After reviewing many hours of video footage of bitou bush flowers in Northern NSW, researchers at the School of Ecosystem Management found that Mesoclanis polana is actually the most frequent pollinator of C. monilifera. Because C. monilifera'' is a weed of National Significance in Australia, that oversight could potentially be devastating to Australian ecosystems. Much like the introduction of the cane toad to control the population of cane beetles, such a discovery is an important reminder about the importance of thoroughly researching biological control agents before introducing them into new ecosystems.

References

External links

Calenduleae
Endemic flora of South Africa
Flora of the Cape Provinces
Fynbos
Trees of South Africa